Chidi Obioma Ahanotu (born October 11, 1970)  is a former American football defensive end in the NFL.

He was originally selected with the fifth pick of the sixth round of the 1993 NFL Draft by the Tampa Bay Buccaneers out of California; he spent the first 8 years of his career with the Buccaneers.  He then played for one year at the St. Louis Rams, Buffalo Bills, San Francisco 49ers, and Miami Dolphins before returning to the Bucs for one final year.

Early life
Ahanotu was born in Modesto, California to Nigerian father and a mother from Alaska.  Ahanotu grew up in Berkeley, California, the middle son of three boys. His father was on the Nigerian national team and taught him and his 2 brothers how to play soccer when they were 5 years old. He also loved to cook.

College career
Ahanotu attended Berkeley High School where he lettered in football and rugby. He was accepted into Columbia University, Hampton University, UCLA, and The University of California, Berkeley (Cal). Ahanotu decided to attend Cal and try his hand at walking on to the team. After his redshirt freshman year Chidi began to play during his 2nd season. After this season Ahanotu earned a full athletic scholarship and became the starting left defensive end for the Golden Bears. Chidi went on to be the starter for 3 more football seasons and earned 1st team All-Pac-10 honors as the best at his position. Ahanotu majored in Integrative Biology and intended to go to medical school to become a doctor before joining the NFL.

Professional career
He was originally selected with the fifth pick of the sixth round of the 1993 NFL Draft by the Tampa Bay Buccaneers out of California; he spent the first 8 years of his career with the Buccaneers.  He then played for one year at the St. Louis Rams, Buffalo Bills, San Francisco 49ers, and Miami Dolphins before returning to the Bucs for one final year. He was named the Tampa Bay Buccaneers "Franchise Player" in 1999. He is currently ranked 5th all-time in quarterback sacks in Buccaneers franchise history with 34.5 Sacks. He recorded 46.5 total sacks in his 12-year NFL career. Ahanotu was also named to the Top 100 All Time Buccaneers List coming in ranked #46th on this list. Of all the Left Defensive Ends to ever play for the Buccaneers, Ahanotu is ranked the best ever for the Buccaneers according to the Top 100 All Time Buccaneers List. Of all the defensive linemen to ever play for the Buccaneers, Ahanotu is ranked 6th best-ever according to the Top 100 All Time Buccaneers List, behind Lee Roy Selmon, Warren Sapp, Simeon Rice, Dave Logan and Dave Pear.

Post-playing career
Ahanotu retired from the NFL in 2005. After retiring, he became the founder of Magellan Entertainment Inc., a full service Talent Management Firm. One the firm's biggest clients is World Champion sprinter Usain Bolt. Magellan Entertainment co-manages Bolt with its partner Gina Ford of G2 Marketing. The firm also touts as one of its clients three-time light heavyweight boxing champion Antonio Tarver. As president and founder of Magellan Entertainment Ahanotu has grown the firm's clients list to include musicians, producers, actors, models, digital media companies and professional athletes.

References

External links
 
 Magellan Entertainment official website

1970 births
Living people
Sportspeople from Modesto, California
American sportspeople of Nigerian descent
American football defensive ends
American football defensive tackles
Berkeley High School (Berkeley, California) alumni
California Golden Bears football players
Players of American football from California
Tampa Bay Buccaneers players
St. Louis Rams players
Buffalo Bills players
San Francisco 49ers players
Miami Dolphins players